The Far Call is a 1929 American lost film directed by Allan Dwan and starring Charles Morton and Leila Hyams. Produced and distributed by the Fox Film Corporation. It is a late silent film with Fox's Movietone sound on film system containing music and sound effects.

Cast
 Charles Morton as Pat Loring
 Leila Hyams as Hilda Larsen
 Warner Baxter
 Arthur Stone as Schmidt
 Warren Hymer as Soup Brophy
 Dan Wolheim as Black O'Neil
 Tiny Sandford as Captain Storkerson (*as Stanley J. Sandford)
 Ullrich Haupt as London Nick
 Charles B. Middleton as Kris Larsen
 Pat Hartigan as Lars Johannson
 Charles Gorman as Haycox
 Ivan Linow as Red Dunkirk
 Harry Gripp as Pete
 Sam Baker as Tubal
 Bernard Siegel as Aleut Chief

See also
1937 Fox vault fire

References

External links

1929 films
American silent feature films
Films directed by Allan Dwan
Lost American films
Fox Film films
1929 drama films
Silent American drama films
American black-and-white films
1929 lost films
Lost drama films
1920s English-language films
1920s American films